Kocaali can refer to:

 Kocaali
 Kocaali, Enez
 Kocaali, Ergani